Events from the year 1505 in England.

Incumbents
 Monarch – Henry VII
 Lord Chancellor – William Warham
 Lord Privy Seal – Richard Foxe
 Secretary of State – Thomas Ruthall

Events
28 June – planned marriage of Henry Tudor and Catherine of Aragon postponed when the dowry fails to arrive from Spain.
Christ's College, Cambridge is granted a royal charter at the instigation of Lady Margaret Beaufort, the King's mother, refounding it under its present name.

Births
William Cavendish, courtier (died 1557)
Philip Hoby, politician (died 1558)
Thomas Wriothesley, 1st Earl of Southampton, politician (died 1550)
Thomas Tallis, composer (died 1585)
Christopher Tye, composer and organist (died 1572)

Deaths
 George Grey, 2nd Earl of Kent, nobleman and soldier (born 1554)
 Robert Wydow, poet and church musician (born 1446)
 Sir Richard Pole, courtier (born 1462)
 William Boleyn, Lord Mayor of London (born 1451)

 
Years of the 16th century in England